Chaúng Dai Ovpuk (The Bone of Father's Hand) is a 1971 Khmer movie directed by So Min Chiv starring Kong Som Eun and Vichara Dany.

Soundtrack

Cast
Kong Som Eun
Vichara Dany
Lim Sophoan
Kim Nova
Sasa Cooney
So Chin
Chin Sinath
Trente Duex
Map Noya
Tat Samnang

1971 films
Khmer-language films
Cambodian drama films